Hatching is an artistic technique used to create tonal or shading effects by drawing (or painting or scribing) closely spaced parallel lines.  When lines are placed at an angle to one another, it is called cross-hatching.  Hatching is also sometimes used to encode colours in monochromatic representations of colour images, particularly in heraldry.

Hatching is especially important in essentially linear media, such as drawing, and many forms of printmaking, such as engraving, etching and woodcut. In Western art, hatching originated in the Middle Ages, and developed further into cross-hatching, especially in the old master prints of the fifteenth century. Master ES and Martin Schongauer in engraving and Erhard Reuwich and Michael Wolgemut in woodcut were pioneers of both techniques, and Albrecht Dürer in particular perfected the technique of crosshatching in both media.

Artists use the technique, varying the length, angle, closeness and other qualities of the lines, most commonly in drawing, linear painting and engraving.

Technique
The main concept is that the quantity, thickness and spacing of the lines will affect the brightness of the overall image and emphasize forms creating the illusion of volume. Hatching lines should always follow (i.e. wrap around) the form. By increasing quantity, thickness and closeness, a darker area will result.

An area of shading next to another area which has lines going in another direction is often used to create contrast.

Line work can be used to represent colors, typically by using the same type of hatch to represent particular tones. For example, red might be made up of lightly spaced lines, whereas green could be made of two layers of perpendicular dense lines, resulting in a realistic image.

Crosshatching is the technique of using line to shade and create value.

Variations

Representation of materials
In technical drawing, the section lining  may indicate the material of a component part of an assembly. Many hatching patterns have been standardized by the American National Standards Institute (ANSI) and the International Standards Organization (ISO), though there are many other predefined patterns that may be used. Thus, the hatching pattern of steel varies from that of aluminum, copper, etc. The patterns are not only for metals. Patterns for grass, gravel, brick, and others are frequently found on architectural drawings.

See also

 Dip pen
 Hatching system (heraldry)
 Printmaking
 Stippling

References

Works cited

External links
 "hatching" article in ArtLex Art Dictionary

Artistic techniques
Technical drawing